Rodong is a Korean language word meaning "labor".

Rodong may also refer to:

Rodong-1, a single stage, mobile liquid propellant ballistic missile developed by North Korea with a range of 900-1300km
Rodong-2, a missile once claimed to have been developed by North Korea in the early 2000s
Rodong-B (Hwasong-10)
Rodong-C (KN-08)
Rodong Sinmun, "Newspaper of the workers", a North Korean newspaper
Rodong, the Malay common name of the edible telescope snail, Telescopium telescopium